Oleana is an Inman Square (Cambridge, Massachusetts) fine dining, Middle Eastern restaurant owned by  Ana Sortun and opened in 2001.  The menu also has Mediterranean influences. Culinary influences on the menu include Spain, Turkey and Armenia.

Honors and awards
2022 Boston (magazine) Best Middle Eastern Restaurant 
Executive Chef Sortun and pastry chef Maura Kilpatrick have been nominated for James Beard Foundation Awards Including 2020, Best Pastry Chef and outstanding Chef

References

Fine dining
Middle Eastern restaurants in the United States
Restaurants in Cambridge, Massachusetts
Inman Square